Stephen Bennett Bevans, SVD (born July 14, 1944) is an American Roman Catholic, priest, theologian, and the Louis J. Luzbetak, SVD Professor of Mission and Culture, Emeritus at Catholic Theological Union in Chicago, Illinois, United States. He is known for his work Models of Contextual Theology.

Biography
Bevans was born on July 14, 1944, in Baltimore, Maryland, and is the son of Bert Bennett and Bernadette (O'Grady) Bevans.

After attending a Society of the Divine Word high school seminary in Riverside, California, he attended Divine Word College, graduating with his B.A. in 1967. He then received his S.T.B. and S.T.L. at the Pontifical Gregorian University in 1970 and 1972, respectively. After his priestly ordination in 1971, he spent 9 years as a missionary in the Philippines. He obtained his M.A. and Ph.D. in Theology in 1984 and 1986, respectively, at the University of Notre Dame. Upon the completion of his graduation study, he started teaching at Catholic Theological Union in Chicago, Illinois, until his retirement in 2015.

He is the past president of the American Society of Missiology and now serves on the editorial board. He is also a member of the World Council of Churches' Commission on World Mission and Evangelism.

His monograph, Models of Contextual Theology, argues that all theology is contextual, whether it is practical theology or systematic theology. On top of the two loci theologici, scripture and tradition, context, in other words, human experience, should be the third source for theological expression.

A festschrift was published in his honor, entitled Christian Mission, Contextual Theology, Prophetic Dialogue (2018).

Selected works
Models of Contextual Theology (2002). Maryknoll, New York: Orbis. 
Constants in Context: A Theology of Mission for Today (2004). Maryknoll, New York: Orbis (With Roger Schroeder). 
An Introduction to Theology in Global Perspective (2009). Maryknoll, New York: Orbis. .
Mission and Culture: The Louis J. Luzbetak Lectures (2012). Maryknoll, New York: Orbis. 
Essays in Contextual Theology (2018). Leiden: Brill.

See also
 A Video by Divine Word Theologate Chicago

References

1944 births
Living people
Pontifical Gregorian University alumni
University of Notre Dame alumni
Catholic Theological Union faculty
21st-century American Roman Catholic theologians
American Roman Catholic missionaries
Roman Catholic missionaries in the Philippines
World Christianity scholars